Velké Žernoseky is a municipality and village in Litoměřice District in the Ústí nad Labem Region of the Czech Republic. It has about 500 inhabitants.

Geography

It lies on the right bank of the Elbe River in the Central Bohemian Uplands.

History
The first written mention of Velké Žernoseky is from 1218, in the foundation deed of the Litoměřice Chapter.

Economy
Since the 12th century, Velké Žernoseky is known for viticulture. It belongs to the Litoměřická wine sub-region and is one of the northernmost wine-growing places in Europe.

Sights
The Church of Saint Nicholas was built in the Gothic style in the 14th century and rebuilt in the 16th century.

Velké Žernoseky Castle is a simple Baroque castle in the centre of the village, built in the 17th century on the site of the former fortress. Today it is used as a winery and for accommodation.

References

External links

Villages in Litoměřice District